The Hiss was an American five piece rock band from Atlanta, Georgia, United States.

Career
Adrian Barrera and Todd Galpin set their sights on Georgia after a lackluster music career in their home state of Florida. They soon met up with Ian Franco, Milton Chapman and Johnny Kral and formed The Hiss. In March 2003 their self-produced single "Triumph" entered the UK Singles Chart. They have toured the U.S. and Europe with Jet, Oasis and The White Stripes. Their sound is comparable to The Stooges, The Velvet Underground and The Rolling Stones. They have released two full-length studio albums. Some enhanced copies of the album have two music videos on them. They are heavily influenced by surrealism and because of this, might be considered art rock. They released a new LP Chocolate Hearts, all songs written in Atlanta after their recording studio in Florida's Key West area was evacuated because of hurricanes. The band split up in November 2008.

In popular culture
"Back on the Radio" featured in videogames Tony Hawk's Underground 2 and FlatOut
"Clever Kicks" featured in videogames NASCAR 2005: Chase for the Cup and Crash 'n' Burn

Members

Last formation 
Adrian Barrera: Guitar and vocals
Todd Galpin: Drums
Milton Chapman: Keyboards and organ
George Reese: Bass

Former members
Ian Franco: Guitar
Johnny Kral: Bass
Mahjula Bah-Kamara: Bass

Discography

Albums
Panic Movement - 2003 - Sanctuary Records
Chocolate Hearts - 2007

Singles
"Triumph" - 2003 - UK No. 53
"Clever Kicks" - 2003 - UK No. 49
"Back On The Radio" - 2003 - UK No. 65

Others
The song "Cazzy" was featured in a psychedelic rock compilation album.
The song "Back On The Radio" was featured in two video games: Flatout and Tony Hawk's Underground 2.
The song "Clever Kicks" was featured in the video games: NASCAR 2005: Chase for the Cup and NASCAR SimRacing.
The song "Clever Kicks" was featured in the movie: CATWOMAN.

References

External links
The Hiss on MTV

Alternative rock groups from Georgia (U.S. state)
American garage rock groups
Garage punk groups
Grunge musical groups
Indie rock musical groups from Georgia (U.S. state)
Musical groups established in 2001
Musical groups disestablished in 2008
Musical groups from Atlanta
Sanctuary Records artists